Jeur is a village in the Karmala taluka of Solapur district in Maharashtra state, India.

Sairat, the controversial and highest-grossing Marathi film of all time based on the theme of forbidden love was set and shot in Jeur village.

Demographics
Covering  and comprising 1491 households at the time of the 2011 census of India, Jeur had a population of 6880. There were 3602 males and 3278 females, with 818 people being aged six or younger.

Notable people
 Award-winning Marathi movie director, and actor Nagraj Manjule was born and brought up in Jeur

References

Villages in Karmala taluka